David Wilson (born 14 November 1966) is an English cricketer.  Wilson is a right-handed batsman who plays primarily as a wicketkeeper.  He was born in Durham, County Durham.

Wilson represented the Durham Cricket Board in 2 List A matches against Herefordshire in the 2nd round of the 2003 Cheltenham & Gloucester Trophy which was played in 2002 and Glamorgan in 3rd round of the same competition which was played in 2003.  In his 2 List A matches, he scored 19 runs, with an unbeaten high score of 19.  In the field he took 2 catches and made 2 stumpings.

He currently plays club cricket for Chester-le-Street Cricket Club in the North East Premier League.

References

External links

1966 births
Living people
Sportspeople from Durham, England
English cricketers
Durham Cricket Board cricketers
Wicket-keepers
Cricketers from County Durham